Gilbert Peak may refer to:

 Gilbert Peak (Utah)
 Gilbert Peak (Washington)